Damasonium bourgaei is a species of plant in the family Alismataceae.

Sources

References 

Flora of Malta
Alismataceae